Kolk ( or ) is a small settlement in the hills above the left bank of the Sava River, south of Šentlambert, in the Municipality of Zagorje ob Savi in central Slovenia. The area is part of the traditional region of Upper Carniola. It is now included with the rest of the municipality in the Central Sava Statistical Region. It includes the hamlets of Zavšenik (in older sources also Savšenik) and Selišče.

References

External links
Kolk on Geopedia

Populated places in the Municipality of Zagorje ob Savi